Minuscule 55 (in the Gregory-Aland numbering), ε 349 (Von Soden), is a Greek minuscule manuscript of the New Testament, on parchment leaves. Palaeographically it has been assigned to the 14th century. The manuscript has complex contents and some marginalia. It was adapted for liturgical use.

Description 

The codex contains a complete text of the four Gospels on 349 parchment leaves (size ). The text is written in one column per page, 21 lines per page. The capital letters in red.

The manuscript containing also text Judges 6:1-24.

Text 

The Greek text of the codex is a representative of the Byzantine text-type. Hermann von Soden classified it to the textual family Kr. Aland placed it in Category V. According to the Claremont Profile Method it represents the textual family Family Kr in Luke 1 and Luke 20. In Luke 10 no profile was made.

History 

The manuscript was written by Γροιγοριου ιερομοναχου.

The manuscript was examined by Mill (as Selden 3), Grabe, Scholz, Tischendorf, and C. R. Gregory in 1883.

It is currently housed in at the Bodleian Library (Selden Supra 6), at Oxford.

See also 

 List of New Testament minuscules
 Biblical manuscript
 Textual criticism

References

Further reading 

 

Greek New Testament minuscules
14th-century biblical manuscripts
Septuagint manuscripts
Bodleian Library collection